Statistics of Primera Fuerza in season 1931-32.

Overview
It was contested by 8 teams, and Atlante won the championship.

League standings

Championship playoff

The championship playoff was played between the top two teams.

Top goalscorers
Players sorted first by goals scored, then by last name.

References
Mexico - List of final tables (RSSSF)

1931-32
Mex
1931–32 in Mexican football